The 2019 Campeonato Brasileiro Série A (officially the Brasileirão Assaí 2019 for sponsorship reasons) was the 63rd season of the Campeonato Brasileiro Série A, the top level of professional football in Brazil, and the 16th edition in a double round-robin since its establishment in 2003. The competition started on 27 April and ended on 8 December 2019.

The top six teams as well as the 2019 Copa do Brasil champions qualified for the Copa Libertadores. The next six best-placed teams not qualified for Copa Libertadores qualified for the Copa Sudamericana and the last four were relegated to Série B for 2020. Palmeiras were the defending champions. During the 2019 season, the official match ball was the Nike Merlin CBF. 

Flamengo secured their sixth league title with four matches to spare on 24 November and just one day after winning the 2019 Copa Libertadores, following Palmeiras' 2–1 loss to Grêmio at home.

Teams

Twenty teams competed in the league – the top sixteen teams from the previous season, as well as four teams promoted from the Série B.

Fortaleza became the first club to be promoted after a 1–2 win against Atlético Goianiense on 3 November 2018. Goiás was promoted on 17 November, and Avaí and CSA on 24 November.

Number of teams by state

Stadiums and locations

Personnel and kits 

(c) = caretaker

Foreign players
The clubs can have a maximum of five foreign players in their Campeonato Brasileiro squads per match, but there is no limit of foreigners in the clubs' squads.

(dn) = Player holding Brazilian dual nationality.

Managerial changes

Standings

League table

Positions by round
The table lists the positions of teams after each week of matches.In order to preserve chronological evolvements, any postponed matches are not included to the round at which they were originally scheduled, but added to the full round they were played immediately afterwards.

Results

Season statistics

Top scorers

Source: Globoesporte.com

Assists 

Source: Soccerway.com

Hat-tricks

Clean sheets

Source: FBref.com

Average home attendances
Ranked from highest to lowest average attendance.

Awards

Annual awards

References 

2019 in Brazilian football
Brazil
Campeonato Brasileiro Série A seasons